Black pepper crab is one of the two most popular ways that crab is served in Singaporean cuisine. It is made by frying hard-shell crabs with black pepper. Unlike the other popular chilli crab dish, it is not cooked in a sauce and therefore has a dry consistency. It is becoming very popular to mix the pepper crab with a fresh jackfruit sauce.

The creation of Singapore's black pepper crab is attributed to Long Beach Seafood Restaurant in 1959.

See also

Chilli crab
Crab in Padang sauce
List of crab dishes
Oyster sauce crab

References

 

Crab dishes
Singaporean cuisine